Libingan ng mga Bayani (LNMB) is a national cemetery within Fort Andres Bonifacio (formerly Fort William McKinley) in Metro Manila, Philippines.

First established in May 1947 as a fitting resting place for Philippine military personnel from privates to generals who served during World War II, it eventually became designated as the official place of burial for deceased Philippine presidents, national heroes, patriots, National Artists and National Scientists.

Among those buried in the cemetery are Filipino soldiers who died during the Philippine Campaign and the Liberation of the Philippines in World War II from 1941 to 1945. Among the Filipino leaders and dignitaries buried there are Presidents Elpidio Quirino, Carlos P. Garcia and Diosdado Macapagal; former Vice President Salvador H. Laurel; generals Artemio Ricarte and Carlos P. Romulo; Armed Forces of the Philippines Chief of Staff Angelo Reyes; and former Senate President and proclaimed Vice President Arturo Tolentino and Blas Ople. Fidel Ramos is the most recent president to be buried there, on August 9.

History

The cemetery was first established in May 1947 as the Republic Memorial Cemetery. It was first established as a tribute and final resting place for the 33,520 to 58,780 Filipino soldiers who died during the Philippine Campaign (1941–42) and the Allied Liberation of the Philippines (1944–45) in World War II. It was established as the Filipino counterpart to the Manila American Cemetery and Memorial, which houses the remains of United States personnel who died during the same war.

On June 16, 1948, Philippine President Elpidio Quirino signed into law the Republic Act 289, also known as An Act Providing for the Construction of a National Pantheon for Presidents of the Philippines, National Heroes, and Patriots of the Country. Section 1 of the Act cites the purpose of creating such pantheon:

While such National Pantheon was never established during Quirino's lifetime, several decrees and laws passed under succeeding administrations led to the eventual use of the Republic Memorial Cemetery as a national pantheon described in Republic Act 289.

On October 27, 1954, President Ramon Magsaysay renamed the Republic Memorial Cemetery as the Libingan ng mga Bayani. On May 28, 1967, President Ferdinand Marcos issued Presidential Proclamation No. 208 ordering the reservation of 142 hectares of land within Fort Bonifacio in consideration for the Libingan to serve not only as a cemetery for military personnel but also as a national shrine for fallen heroes. He ordered it placed under the administration of the Military Shrines Services of the Philippine Veterans Affairs Office, an agency under the Department of National Defense.

On April 9, 1986, Armed Forces of the Philippines Chief of Staff Fidel Ramos and President Corazon Aquino issued Armed Forces Regulations G 161-373, also known as "The allocation of Cemetery Plots at the LNMB". This military-issued regulation established the interment policy that would become the basis for the burial of personalities at the Libingan ng mga Bayani. Moreover, by virtue of Executive Order No. 131 issued by former President Fidel Ramos on 26 October 1993, National Artists and National Scientists of the Philippines were also made eligible for interment at the cemetery.

In 2007, due to overcrowding at the Fort Bonifacio site, the cemetery's administration started exploring sites for Libingan ng mga Bayani annexes in Luzon, Visayas and Mindanao. Only one has been completed so far, the ₱24-million, five-hectare extension at Camp Hernandez in Dingle, Iloilo.

On November 18, 2016, former dictator Ferdinand Marcos was buried in a private ceremony with military honors, amid much controversy resulting in a handful of protests in various parts of the Philippines.

On January 4, 2019, a five-year development program for the cemetery, which is projected to cost about ₱3.3 billion, was approved by Secretary of National Defense Delfin Lorenzana. The program's goal is to rehabilitate and transform the LNMB into a world-class national cemetery at par with the nearby Manila American Cemetery. The first phase of the program is to be implemented by the Bases Conversion and Development Authority and includes the construction of a dignified cemetery area, a historical theme park, and a memorial shrine.

Administration

The cemetery is administered and maintained by the Grave Service Unit (GSU), a unit of the Philippine Army Support Command of the AFP. Its mission is to provide burial and niche services to deceased military personnel and other personalities interred at the cemetery. Aside from maintaining the cemetery and the military grave site at Manila North Cemetery, the unit is also capable of providing mortuary and memorial services to authorized personnel.

Interment policy
According to Armed Forces of the Philippines (AFP) Regulation G 161-373, the following persons are entitled to interment at the Libingan ng mga Bayani:
 Medal of Valor awardees
 Presidents or Commanders-in-Chief, AFP
 Vice Presidents of the Philippines
 The secretaries of National Defense
 AFP Chiefs of Staff
 General/Flag Officers
 Active and retired military personnel of the AFP
 Justices of the Supreme Court (either Chief or Associate Justice)
 Justices of the Court of Appeals (either Chief or Associate Justice)
 Senators and Senate President
 Former AFP members who laterally entered/joined the Philippine National Police (PNP) and the Philippine Coast Guard (PCG)
 Veterans of the Philippine Revolution of 1896, the First and Second World Wars, as well as recognized guerrillas
 Government dignitaries, statesmen, national artists and other deceased persons whose interment has been approved by the commander-in-chief, Congress or the Secretary of National Defense, and
 Former Presidents, Vice Presidents, Secretaries of National Defense, widows of former Presidents and Chiefs of Staff
 National Artists and National Scientists of the Philippines

However, the same regulation also prohibits "personnel who were dishonorably separated/ reverted/ discharged from the service and personnel who were convicted by final judgment of an offense involving moral turpitude" from interment at the Libingan ng mga Bayani.

Features

The first structure that visitors will see upon entering the grounds of the cemetery complex is the Heroes Memorial Gate, a large concrete tripod with a stairway leading to an upper view deck with a metal sculpture at the center. Erected on opposite sides of the main entrance road near the Heroes Memorial Gate are two 12-foot high black stone walls which bear the words that General Douglas MacArthur uttered during a journey to the Philippines in 1961: "I do not know the dignity of his birth, but I do know the glory of his death."

The main structure, located at the center of the cemetery, is the Tomb of the Unknown Soldier, where wreath laying ceremonies are held when Philippine government officials and foreign dignitaries visit the cemetery. Inscribed on the tomb are the words: "Here lies a Filipino soldier whose name is known only to God." Behind the tomb are three marble pillars representing the three main island groups in the Philippines: Luzon, Visayas, and Mindanao.

There are several pylons as well commemorating the gallantry of Filipino soldiers who died in various wars in world history. These include the Korean Memorial Pylon, which honors 112 Filipino officers and men who were members of the Philippine Expeditionary Forces to Korea (PEFTOK) who perished during the Korean War; the Vietnam Veterans Memorial Pylon, which was dedicated to the members of the Philippine contingent and Philippine civic action groups (PHILCON-V and PHILCAG-V) that were sent to Vietnam during the Vietnam War from 1964 to 1971; and the Philippine World War II Guerrillas Pylon, which was erected by the Veterans Federation of the Philippines as a testimony to the indomitable spirit and bravery of the Filipino guerrillas of World War II.

Notable burials

Presidents of the Philippines 
 Elpidio Quirino (1890–1956), 6th President
 Carlos P. Garcia (1896–1971), 8th President
 Diosdado Macapagal (1910–1997), 9th President
 Ferdinand Marcos (1917–1989), 10th President
 Fidel V. Ramos (1928–2022), 12th President

Vice President of the Philippines 
 Salvador H. Laurel (1928–2004), 10th Vice President

Chief Justices of the Philippines 
 Fred Ruiz Castro, (1914–1979), 12th Chief Justice of the Supreme Court of the Philippines
 Enrique Fernando, (1915–2004), 13th Chief Justice of the Supreme Court of the Philippines
 Claudio Teehankee, Sr. (1918–1989), 16th Chief Justice of the Supreme Court of the Philippines

Chiefs of Staff the Armed Forces of the Philippines 
 Artemio Ricarte (1866–1945), Philippine Revolutionary Army Chief of Staff
 Gen. Alfredo M. Santos (1905–1990), 11th Chief of Staff of the Armed Forces of the Philippines
 Gen. Arturo T. Enrile (1940–1998), 24th Chief of Staff of the Armed Forces of the Philippines
 Gen. Angelo T. Reyes (1945–2011), 28th Chief of Staff of the Armed Forces of the Philippines

Secretaries of National Defense 
 Alejo Santos (1911–1984), former Secretary of National Defense
 Ernesto S. Mata (1915–2012), former Secretary of National Defense
 Rafael Ileto (1920–2003), former Secretary of National Defense
 Fortunato Abat (1925–2018), former Secretary of National Defense
 Gilberto Teodoro Sr. (1927–2008), former administrator of Social Security System and father of former Defense Secretary Gilberto Teodoro Jr.

Senators of the Philippines 
 Arturo Tolentino (1910–2004), former Secretary of Foreign Affairs and Senator
 Blas Ople (1927–2003), Secretary of Foreign Affairs and Senator

Other government dignitaries 
 Carlos P. Romulo (1898–1985), former Minister of Foreign Affairs and President of the United Nations General Assembly
 Teodoro Locsín Sr. (1914–2000), Philippine Free Press co-founder, journalist and father of former Congressman and current Secretary of Foreign Affairs Teodoro Locsin Jr.
 Haydee Yorac (1941–2005), Chairperson of the Presidential Commission on Good Government

National Scientists of the Philippines 
 Encarnacion Alzona (1895–2001),  pioneering Filipino historian, educator and suffragist. The first Filipino woman to obtain a Ph.D., and she was conferred in 1985 the rank and title of National Scientist of the Philippines for Philippine History.
 Alfredo Lagmay (1919–2005), a Philippine psychologist whose studies on experimental analysis of behavior modification, relaxation and related states, and hypnosis
 Fe Del Mundo (1911–2011), a Philippine pediatrician whose studies led to the improvement of the neonatal incubator
 Perla Santos-Ocampo (1931–2012), a Philippine pediatrician whose studies on malnutrition and child growth and development was instrumental to the country's fight against child malnutrition
 Eduardo Quisumbing (1895–1986), National Scientist of the Philippines for Plant Taxonomy, Systematics, and Morphology
 Gelia T. Castillo (1928–2017), National Scientist of the Philippines for Rural Sociology

National Artists of the Philippines 
 Guillermo Tolentino (1890–1976), National Artist for Visual Arts
 Vicente Manansala (1910–1981), National Artist for Visual Arts
 Victorio Edades (1895–1985), National Artist for Visual Arts
 Ang Kiukok (1931–2005), National Artist for Visual Arts
 José T. Joya (1931–1995), National Artist for Visual Arts
 Napoleon Abueva (1930–2018), National Artist for Visual Arts
 Abdulmari Imao (1936–2014), National Artist for Visual Arts
 Francisco Mañosa (1931–2019), National Artist for Architecture
 Ramón Valera (1912–1972), National Artist for Fashion Design
 Leonor Orosa-Goquingco (1917–2005), National Artist for Dance
 Francisca Reyes-Aquino (1899–1983), National Artist for Dance
 Ernani Cuenco (1936–1988), National Artist for Music
 Jovita Fuentes (1894–1980), National Artist for Music
 Antonio J. Molina (1895–1978), National Artist for Music
 Col. Antonino R. Buenaventura (1904–1996), National Artist for Music
 Andrea Veneracion (1928-2013), National Artist for Music
 Nick Joaquin (1917–2004), National Artist for Literature
 N. V. M. Gonzalez (1915–1999), National Artist for Literature
 Francisco Arcellana (1916–2002), National Artist for Literature
 Alejandro Roces (1924–2011), National Artist for Literature, former chairman of Movie and Television Review and Classification Board and Secretary of Education
 Carlos Quirino (1910–1999), National Artist for Historical Literature
 Wilfrido Ma. Guerrero (1911–1995), National Artist for Theater
 Gerardo de León (1913–1981), National Artist for Film and Broadcast Arts
 Eddie Romero (1924–2013), National Artist for Film and Broadcast Arts

Others 
 Col. Jesus A. Villamor (1914–1971), a Filipino American pilot who fought the Japanese in World War II.
 Capt. Rommel Sandoval (1979–2017), Hero of Marawi Siege
 Max Soliven (1929–2006), The Philippine Star journalist and co-founder

See also
 Burial of Ferdinand Marcos
 Manila American Cemetery
 Capas National Shrine
 Mount Samat National Shrine
 Monument memorializing WW-II landing U.S. forces in Barangay Sawang, Romblon, Romblon

References

External links
 
 

1947 establishments in the Philippines
Military cemeteries
Military cemeteries in the Philippines
Cemeteries in Metro Manila
Landmarks in the Philippines
National Shrines of the Philippines
Cultural Properties of the Philippines in Metro Manila
Taguig